Rose Ní Conchobair, Princess of Connacht and Ireland, Lady of Meath, fl. 1180.

Rose was one of some thirteen children of King of Ireland, Ruaidrí Ua Conchobair. About 1180 she married Hugh de Lacy, Lord of Meath (before 1179 to 1186). De Lacy had five daughters and two sons by his first wife Rose de Monmouth. Rose Ní Conchobair was the mother of two more children, William Gorm de Lacy and Ysota de Lacy.

External links
 https://web.archive.org/web/20110615122847/http://www.ria.ie/RIA/files/1a/1a50fbf3-5fb8-4148-bb8e-3ca6d22a01a9.pdf

Medieval Gaels from Ireland
12th-century Irish people
People from County Galway
People from County Meath
People from County Roscommon
Rose
Irish princesses
Rose
12th-century Irish women